The Conference on Retroviruses and Opportunistic Infections (CROI) is an annual scientific meeting devoted to the understanding, prevention and treatment of HIV/AIDS and the opportunistic infections associated with AIDS. Thousands of leading researchers and clinicians from around the world convene in a different location in North America each year for the Conference.

List of conferences
Below is the list of conferences and their venue:

External links 
 
 Webcasts of past conferences
 Conference Manager, IAS-USA

International AIDS Conferences
Recurring events established in 1993
Annual events in the United States